Vadim Yevgenyevich Dengin (born on 23 September 1980) is a Russian politician. He was a deputy of the State Duma of the Russian Federation. He is a member of the Liberal Democratic Party of Russia.

Early political career
Dengin was born in Obninsk, in the Soviet Union. Beginning in 1997, Dengin worked as a teacher at the Obninsk Center of Extracurricular Activities and later in the youth wing of the Liberal Democratic Party of Russia. In 2004, he graduated from the Moscow State University of Economics, Statistics, and Informatics. He was a senior expert of the State Duma Committee on Youth Affairs.

He was a candidate for the Governor of Kaluga Oblast on behalf of the Liberal Democratic Party of Russia on 13 September 2015 . He came in third place with 8.36 percent of the vote.

Legislative career

Dengin has spoken strongly in favor of expanding the regulative powers of the Federal Service for Supervision in the Sphere of Telecom, Information Technologies and Mass Communications (Roskomnadzor) over the internet.

References

External links
 Профиль на сайте Государственной Думы РФ
 Профиль на официальном сайте ЛДПР

Moscow State University of Economics, Statistics, and Informatics alumni
1980 births
People from Obninsk
Living people
Liberal Democratic Party of Russia politicians
Sixth convocation members of the State Duma (Russian Federation)
Seventh convocation members of the State Duma (Russian Federation)
Members of the Federation Council of Russia (after 2000)